Belgium's Got Talent is the Dutch language format of the Got Talent series, which was created by Simon Cowell, who also created the series The X Factor. It is broadcast on the Flemish language channel VTM, and is hosted by Koen Wauters and Laura Tesoro.

Judges on the program have included Rob Vanoudenhoven (seasons 1-3), Karen Damen (seasons 1-3) and Ray Cokes (seasons 1-3). The current cast of judges features Dan Karaty (seasons 4-now), An Lemmens (seasons 4-now), Stan Van Samang (seasons 4-now) and Niels Destadsbader (seasons 3-now).

The first season, which was in 2012, was won by Karolien Goris who was an 11 year old singer. The second season, which was in 2013, was won by Michael Lanzo who was a 34 year old singer. After the series was off the air in 2014, it returned for the third season in 2015 who was won by an Italian named Domenico Vaccaro who was a 22 year old pole dancer. The fourth season, which was in 2016 and 2017, is won by Baba Yega who are a dance troupe. The fifth season was in 2018, and was won by Tascha and Ian, who are an acrobatic dance couple.

References

Got Talent
Belgian television series based on British television series
2012 Belgian television series debuts
Belgian music television shows
VTM (TV channel) original programming